The Communist Party of Mexico (PCM) is a communist party in Mexico.

The party was originally named the Party of Mexican Communists. It was renamed the Communist Party of Mexico in 2010.

References

External links
 

Communist parties in Mexico
Far-left politics in Mexico
Political parties in Mexico
Political parties with year of establishment missing

International Meeting of Communist and Workers Parties